The Infantry Corps (INF) is the largest component of the Irish Army. Infantry soldiers are regarded as operational troops who must be prepared for tactical deployment in any location at short notice. In wartime, this means that they will be among the front line troops in the defence of the State. In peacetime however they can be seen daily performing operational duties in Aid to the Civil Power (ATCP) such as providing escorts to cash, prisoner or explosive shipments, patrols of vital state installations and border patrols, including check points.

The infantry corps consists of a total of seven battalions, a single mechanised company and the Infantry School.

An Chéad Chathlán Coisithe 
An Chéad Chathlán Coisithe (English: The First Infantry Battalion) was established as an Irish language speaking unit in Galway in 1924. The role of An Chéad Chathlán Coisithe was seen as very important as far as the status and use of the first official language (Irish) of the State was concerned. All the armed forces units except An Chéad Cathlán functioned exclusively through the medium of the State's second official language (English). In modern times, the use of Irish as a working language in Óglaigh na hÉireann would appear to have been abandoned, even in An Chéad Chathlán. The then Minister for Defence, Mr O'Toole (on 4 December 1986) presented details regarding the recruitment of native Irish speakers to An Chéad Chathlán. These details show that no recruit from a Gaeltacht area was enlisted into the battalion in 1983. Under the 'Defence Forces [sic] Scheme' 2006-2009 ( under Section 11 of the Official Languages Act 2003) Óglaigh na hÉireann have undertaken to improve the delivery of services in Irish to the public. The aim of the Official Languages Act 2003 is to increase and improve in an organised manner over a period of time the quantity and quality of services provided for the public through Irish by public bodies. The legislation intends to create a space for the language in public affairs in Ireland.,It is noteworthy that the term public means individuals, legal persons and corporate bodies. lrlsh air corp
are acting in a capacity which is representative of the State, Government or, where appropriate, contractor personnel, providing a service on behalf of Óglaigh na hÉireann. Consequently, persons who fulfil official functions of a public nature, even though they are legal persons, do not come within the meaning of the word public when they are fulfilling those official functions.

Only in Gaeltacht areas is there an onus on Óglaigh na hÉireann to use Irish as the working language of the force. Section 13(2)(e) of the Official Languages Act states that a Public Body shall " ensure that the Irish language becomes the working language in its offices in the Gaeltacht not later than such date as may be determined by it with the consent of the Minister."There are no permanently manned Barracks or Posts of Óglaigh na hÉireann in Gaeltacht regions, "there are, however, training centres of na hÓglaigh Chúltaca (Reserve elements) manned on a part-time basis in the following locations: Carna, Maigh Cuilinn, An Cheathrú Rua, An Daingean." Under its agreed Language Scheme Óglaigh an hÉireann "will ensure that, by 2012, Irish will become the working language of these locations." Ceremonial Military Guard 

The Ceremonial Military Guard (Garda Míleata Searmanais) of the Irish Defence Forces is a guard of honour unit drawn from every battalion in the corps. It is also known as the Garda Onóra (Guard of Honour in English). It is inspected by the President of Ireland, Taoiseach or visiting military and political dignitaries. Personnel of the guard carry Steyr AUG rifles.

The Defence Forces participate in the State ceremonial connected with:

 Presidential Inaugurations
 Presidential State Visits Abroad
 State Visits to Ireland by Heads of State and Government
 Presentation of Credentials by Ambassadors
 1916 Commemoration Ceremonies
 State Funerals
 National Day of Commemoration
 Easter Parade
 Changing of the Guard on Merrion Square
 National Famine Commemoration

The guard wears the Service Dress (SD) on ceremonial occasions. The Ceremonial Military Guard also takes part in the Changing of the Guard at Merrion Square park in Dublin.

Units
Current units of the Infantry Corps:
 An Chéad Chathlán Coisithe
 3 Infantry Battalion
 6 Infantry Battalion
 7 Infantry Battalion
 12 Infantry Battalion
 27 Infantry Battalion
 28 Infantry Battalion
 1 Mechanised Infantry Company
 Infantry School
 Officer Training Wing
 Non Commissioned Officers Training Wing
 Infantry Weapons Wing

Disestablished units:
 2 Infantry Battalion (1924-2012)
 4 Infantry Battalion (1924-2012)
 5 Infantry Battalion (1924-2012)
 6 Infantry Battalion (1924-1929) - (Current 6 Inf Bn established in 1940) 7 Infantry Battalion (1924-1929, 1940-1959) - (Current 7 Inf Bn established in 2012) 8 Infantry Battalion (1924-1929, 1940-1946)
 9 Infantry Battalion (1924-1929, 1940-1946)
 10 Infantry Battalion (1924-1929, 1940-1946)
 11 Infantry Battalion (1924-1929, 1940-1946)
 12 Infantry Battalion (1924-1929) - (Current 12 Inf Bn established in 1940) 13 Infantry Battalion (1924-1929, 1940-1959)
 14 Infantry Battalion (1924-1928, 1941-1946)
 15 Infantry Battalion (1924-1928, 1941-1946)
 16 Infantry Battalion (1924-1928, 1941-2005)
 17 Infantry Battalion (1924-1927, 1941-1946)
 18 Infantry Battalion (1924-1927, 1941-1946)
 19 Infantry Battalion (1924-1927, 1941-1946)
 20 Infantry Battalion (1924-1927, 1941-1946)
 21 Infantry Battalion (1924-1927, 1941-1946)
 22 Infantry Battalion (1924-1927, 1941-1946)
 23 Infantry Battalion (1924-1927, 1941-1946)
 24 Infantry Battalion (1924-1927, 1941-1946)
 25 Infantry Battalion (1924-1927, 1941-1946)
 26 Infantry Battalion (1924-1927)
 27 Infantry Battalion (1924-1927) - (Current 27 Inf Bn established in 1973)''
 29 Infantry Battalion (1976-1998)
 30 Infantry Battalion (1977-1998)
 31 Infantry Battalion (1941-1946)

Disestablished reserve units:
 32 Reserve Infantry Battalion (Made up of 14, 15 and 22 Battalions of the FCA) (2012)
 33 Reserve Infantry Battalion (2012)
 34 Reserve Infantry Battalion (2012)
 51 Reserve Infantry Battalion (2012)
 56 Reserve Infantry Battalion (2012)
 58 Reserve Infantry Battalion (2012)
 62 Reserve Infantry Battalion (made up of 20 and 21 Battalions of the FCA) (2012)
 65 Reserve Infantry Battalion (made up of 7 FCA Battalion) (2012)
 67 Reserve Infantry Battalion (2012)

Gallery

See also 
 Defence Forces (Ireland)
 Irish Army
 Irish Air Corps
 Irish Naval Service
 Guard of honour
 Modern Irish Army uniform
 Steyr AUG

References

External links

 The Infantry Corps | Irish Army
 Merrion Square 2015 Preparation
 28th Inf Bn on Ceremonial Military Guard Duty - 17 August 2013
 27 Infantry Battalion perform ceremonial drill at the National Memorial, Merrion Square

Military of the Republic of Ireland
Infantry
Military units and formations established in 1924